Anna Kournikova and Janet Lee were the defending champions, but Kournikova did not compete this year. Lee teamed up with Corina Morariu and lost in quarterfinals to Ai Sugiyama and Tamarine Tanasugarn.

Émilie Loit and Nicole Pratt won the title by defeating Ai Sugiyama and Tamarine Tanasugarn 6–3, 6–3 in the final.

Seeds

Draws

Draw

References
 Official Results Archive (ITF)
 Official Results Archive (WTA)

China Open
2003 China Open (tennis)